Campo Pequeno station is part of the Yellow Line of the Lisbon Metro.

History
It is one of the 11 stations that belong to the original Lisbon Metro network, opened on December 29, 1959. This station is located on Avenida da República and takes its name from the nearby Campo Pequeno square and bullring.

The architectural design of the original station is by Falcão e Cunha. On March 26, 1979, the station was extended, based on the architectural design of Benoliel de Carvalho. On December 29, 1994, the station was refurbished, based on the architectural design of Duarte Nuno Simões and Nuno Simões.

Connections

Urban buses

Carris 
 207 Cais do Sodré ⇄ Fetais
 727 Estação Roma-Areeiro ⇄ Restelo - Av. das Descobertas 
 736 Cais do Sodré ⇄ Odivelas (Bairro Dr. Lima Pimentel)
 738 Quinta dos Barros ⇄ Alto de Santo Amaro
 744 Marquês de Pombal ⇄ Moscavide (Quinta das Laranjeiras)
 749 ISEL ⇄ Estação Entrecampos
 754 Campo Pequeno ⇄ Alfragide
 756 Olaias ⇄ Rua da Junqueira
 783 Amoreiras (Centro Comercial) ⇄ Portela - Rua Mouzinho de Albuquerque

Aerobus 
 Linha 2 Aeroporto ⇄ Sete Rios

See also
 List of Lisbon metro stations

References

External links

Yellow Line (Lisbon Metro) stations
Railway stations opened in 1959